This article contains the discography of Japanese rock band High and Mighty Color.

Albums

Studio albums

Compilation albums

Video albums

Singles

References

Discographies of Japanese artists
Rock music group discographies
Discography